Tullyhommon or Tullyhomman is a small village in County Fermanagh, Northern Ireland. It is beside the bigger village of Pettigo, which lies in County Donegal in the Republic of Ireland. The two are divided by the River Termon, which forms part of the boundary between Northern Ireland and the Republic. In the 2001 Census the village had a population of 63 people.

History
On 4 June 1922 the village became occupied by members of the Irish Republican Army (IRA), part of Michael Collins campaign against Northern Ireland, during the Battle of Pettigo and Belleek. The village of Belleek,  from Tullyhomon became part of the new Northern Ireland and Pettigo was retained by the Irish Free State. Soldiers from the British Army crossed Lough Erne in order to fight the IRA and the estimated casualties were three IRA men killed, six wounded and four captured, the British lost one soldier while two civilians who were killed in the fighting. There is a memorial on the Belleek Road to those who "died fighting against British forces in Pettigo 4-6-1922", while a mere few metres from it is a memorial to those "who gave their lives in the Great War 1914–1918".

The Troubles
On 30 August 1973, British Army non commissioned officer S/Sgt Ronald Beckett (aged 36) was killed while trying to defuse a bomb planted by the Provisional IRA at Tullyhommon Post Office.

On 8 November 1987, a Provisional IRA bomb exploded at a Remembrance Sunday ceremony in nearby Enniskillen, killing 11 people and injuring 63. A few hours after the blast, the IRA called a radio station and said it had abandoned a  bomb in Tullyhommon after it failed to detonate. That morning, a Remembrance Sunday parade (which included many members of the Boys' and Girls' Brigades) had unwittingly gathered near the bomb, which was larger and had the capacity to inflict more casualties than those at Enniskillen. British soldiers and RUC officers had also been there, and the IRA said it triggered the bomb when soldiers were standing beside it. It was defused by security forces and was found to have a command wire leading to a "firing point" across the border.

People
 Basil McIvor (17 June 1928 – 5 November 2004), Ulster Unionist politician and pioneer of integrated education, was born in Tullyhommon.

References 

Villages in County Fermanagh
Republic of Ireland–United Kingdom border crossings